Metallurg Magnitogorsk is a professional ice hockey team based in Magnitogorsk, Chelyabinsk Oblast, Russia. They are members of the Kharlamov Division of the Kontinental Hockey League. They also competed in the Champions Hockey League, losing the 2008–09 season championship round to Swiss club, the ZSC Lions.

Metallurg Magnitogorsk won the Gagarin Cup in the 2013–14 KHL season and the 2015–16 KHL season.

History
Metallurg was founded in 1955 by the Magnitogorsk Iron and Steel Works as a Class B team that competed in the Chelyabinsk Oblast and the RSFSR championships. Since the 80s it joined the Second League (third by importance) of the Soviet Class A and won its championships twice, in 1988–89 and 1989–90 seasons. After two more seasons in the second level of the USSR hockey Magnitogorsk club became one of the founders of the International Hockey League, the first Post-Soviet major pro hockey association.
 Magnitogorsk advanced to the Russian Superleague finals six times becoming a three-time champion of Russia.

Victoria Cup
On 1 October 2008, Metallurg Magnitogorsk played against NHL's New York Rangers in the inaugural Victoria Cup at the PostFinance-Arena in Bern with an attendance of 13,794. Metallurg Magnitogorsk led most of the game, 3–0 at one point, but ultimately lost 4–3 by the Rangers' Ryan Callahan breakaway goal with 20 seconds remaining in the game. Denis Platonov, Vladimir Malenkikh and Nikolai Zavarukhin scored for Metallurg, and Dan Fritsche scored and Chris Drury scored twice for the Rangers. As a sign of respect, Russian Dmitri Kalinin and Ukrainian Nikolay Zherdev accepted the Victoria Cup trophy on behalf of the New York Rangers.

2022

After the 2022 Russian invasion of Ukraine, Juho Olkinuora elected to leave the team.

Season-by-season record
For the full season-by-season history, see List of Metallurg Magnitogorsk seasons.

Note: GP = Games played, W = Wins, L = Losses, OTW = Overtime/shootout wins, OTL = Overtime/shootout losses, Pts = Points, GF = Goals for, GA = Goals against

Players

Current roster

Team captains

Sergei Mogilnikov 1991–94
Sergei Starkovski 1994–95
Mikhail Borodulin 1995–96
Evgeny Koreshkov 1996–97
Mikhail Borodulin 1997–99
Sergei Gomolyako 1999–2000
Evgeny Koreshkov 2000–03
Valeri Karpov 2003–05
Evgeny Varlamov 2005–06
Ravil Gusmanov 2006–08
Vitaly Atyushov 2008–11
Sergei Fedorov 2011–12
Denis Platonov 2012
Evgeni Malkin 2012–13
Sergei Mozyakin 2013–21
Egor Yakovlev 2021–

Head coaches

Felix Mirsky 1955–57
Georgy Mordukhovich 1957–58
Georgy Mordukhovich 1969–71
Valery Postnikov 1971–76
Khalim Mingaleev 1976–79
Valery Postnikov 1979–96
Valery Belousov 1996–2003
Marek Sykora 2003–05
Dave King 2005–06
Fedor Kanareykin 2006–07
Valery Postnikov 2007–08
Valery Belousov 2008–10
Kari Heikkilä 2010–11
Aleksander Barkov 2011
Fedor Kanareykin 2011–12
Paul Maurice 2012–13
Mike Keenan 2013–15
Ilya Vorobiev 2015–17
Viktor Kozlov 2017–18
Josef Jandač 2018–19
Ilya Vorobiev 2019–present

Retired numbers

Franchise leaders

All-time KHL scoring leaders

These are the top-ten point-scorers in franchise history. Figures are updated after each completed KHL regular season.

Note: Pos = Position; GP = Games played; G = Goals; A = Assists; Pts = Points; P/G = Points per game;  = current Metallurg player'';

Awards and trophies
Gagarin Cup
 Winners (2): 2014, 2016
 Runners-up (1): 2017

Opening Cup 
 Winners (2): 2014–15, 2016–17

Russian Superleague
 Winners (4): 1997–98, 1998–99, 2000–01, 2006–07
 Runners-up (1): 2003–04
 3rd place (3): 1999–2000, 2001–02, 2005–06

Silver Stone Trophy
 Winners (3): 1999, 2000,  2008

IIHF Super Cup
 Winners (1): 2000
 Runners-up (1): 1999

Champions Hockey League
 Runners-up (1): 2008–09

Spengler Cup
 Winners (1): 2005

Victoria Cup
 Runners-up (1): 2008

Tampere Cup
 Winners (3): 2005, 2006, 2008

Hockeyades (Vallé de Joux)
 Winners (1): 2009

Davos Hockey Summit
 Runners-up (1): 2018

References

External links
  

 
Ice hockey teams in Russia
Sport in Chelyabinsk Oblast
Kontinental Hockey League teams
Sport in Magnitogorsk